Novosasykul (Yañı Haśıqkül) is a rural locality (a village) in Kushtiryakovsky Selsoviet, Bakalinsky District, Bashkortostan, Russia. The population was 129 as of 2010. There are 3 streets.

Geography 
Novosasykul is located 36 km southwest of Bakaly (the district's administrative centre) by road. Bulyak is the nearest rural locality.

References 

Rural localities in Bakalinsky District